Ryan White (born December 23, 1988, Los Angeles, United States) is an American professional basketball player who last played for Uhud Medina in Saudi Arabia.

In 2016, he played for Kožuv of the Macedonian First League.

Professional career
During his career, White has played in Denmark, Kosovo, Luxembourg and Macedonia.

External links
 at espn.go.com
 at eurobasket.com
 at txstatebobcats.com
 at foxsports.com

References 

1988 births
Living people
American expatriate basketball people in Denmark
American expatriate basketball people in Kosovo
American expatriate basketball people in Luxembourg
American expatriate basketball people in North Macedonia
American men's basketball players
Basketball players from Houston
Point guards
Texas State Bobcats men's basketball players